Jane Bos (born Jane Malka-Meunier) was a French composer of film scores between 1927 and 1946, an era when it was very rare for women to do so. 

Born on 26 October 1897 in Marseille, she was a French composer and lyricist known by several pen names she used: Jane Bos (her preferred pseudonym) Jeanne Bos, Jane Boss and Paul Chantelauze. 

Apart from her work in film, Jane Bos also authored many pieces for piano, as well as songs, including some for Charles Trénet, during decades from the 1920s to the 1940s.

She died on 16 April 1975 at the age of 77.

Selected filmography
She has been credited with 51 compositions for film and one soundtrack from 1931 to 1946. Selected works include the following.

The Wonderful Day (1932)
Toto (1933)
600,000 Francs a Month (1933)
The Dying Land (1936)
The Mysterious Lady (1936)
Jacques and Jacotte (1936)
The Men Without Names (1937)
The Club of Aristocrats (1937)
The West (1938)
Troubled Heart (1938)
Miquette (1940)

Selected songs 

 Hélène, music by Bos, lyrics by Charles Trenet, sung by Charles Trenet (1932)
 Pourquoi? sung by Charles Trenet, 1935
 La terre qui meurt Music of the film "La terre qui meurt" (1936) by Jean Vallée
 L'escale sung by André Dumas 
 Le champion de ces dames, Music of the film of the same title (1935) by René Jayet
 Marie des Angoisses, Music of the film of the same title (1935) by Michel Bernheim
 Viens! sung by Charles Trenet (1932)
 Chantez, mon coeur! sung by Charles Trenet (1932)
 Sais-tu? sung by Charles Trenet (1932)

References

Bibliography
 Crisp, Colin. French Cinema—A Critical Filmography: Volume 1, 1929-1939. Indiana University Press, 2015.
 Le Conservatoire national de musique et de déclamation 1900-1930 : documents historiques et administratifs / Anne Bongrain, 2012. p. 547

External links

French composers
1897 births
1975 deaths
20th-century French composers